Lorenzo Flaherty (born 24 November 1967) is an Italian actor. He is the son of an Irish father and an Italian mother. He has appeared in more than forty films since 1986.

Selected filmography

References

External links 

1967 births
Living people
Italian male film actors
Italian people of Irish descent